Michael Allen Nunan (born 12 April 1949) is a former Australian rules footballer who played for the Sturt Football Club, Norwood Football Club and the North Adelaide Football Club in the South Australian National Football League (SANFL), as well as for the Richmond Football Club in the Victorian Football League (VFL).

Nunan had a highly decorated playing career, winning premierships with Sturt and Norwood before becoming coach of North Adelaide and leading the club to two premierships.

Nunan was recognized for his achievements in South Australian football when he was among the inaugural inductees at the establishment of the South Australian Football Hall of Fame in 2002.

SANFL career
Nunan played his football as a rover. He joined  from Port Pirie in 1966 and during his 188 games with the Double Blues, he played in their 1969, 1970, 1974 and 1976 premiership sides. Having spent his whole playing career at Sturt under the tutelage of the legendary Jack Oatey, it was no surprise that Nunan was heavily influenced by him when he later became a coach. He then coached North Adelaide to premierships in 1987 and 1991 during his twelve seasons as senior coach.

His solitary VFL senior game came while he was on National Service training in Melbourne.  The previous week he had played in the  reserves side while fellow Sturt footballer and conscript, Malcolm Greenslade, played in the senior side. The next week they both played in the seniors. Both then returned to the SANFL.

Coaching career

Fitzroy Football Club senior coach
Nunan was appointed senior coach of Fitzroy Football Club for the 1996 season, when he replaced caretaker senior coach Alan McConnell, who replaced Bernie Quinlan, after Quinlan was sacked in the middle of the 1995 season. 

Nunan was at the helm for Fitzroy's last-ever AFL win, in Round 8 against  at Whitten Oval on 16 May 1996. It was an emotional day for many Fitzroy fans, and he described it as "a relief and reward for those players who had worked very hard to improve their skill levels".  
After Fitzroy lost to Essendon in Round 13, 1996 and just 48 hours after Fitzroy announced its intentions to merge with Brisbane Bears, Nunan announced his resignation as senior coach of Fitzroy Football Club to the staff and players, which he had planned to do if a merger went ahead. As he left the room, he remembered that the club doorman, Tommy Couch, had taken a liking to Nunan's jacket and had asked him if he could have it if he couldn't fulfill his commitments. So he returned and handed Couch the jacket.  Nunan was then replaced by Alan McConnell, who returned to the role in his second stint as caretaker senior coach of Fitzroy Football Club in the 1996 season for the last eight games. At the end of the 1996 season, the Fitzroy Football Club merged with Brisbane Bears to become the newly formed Brisbane Lions Football Club.

References

Bibliography
 Hogan P: The Tigers Of Old, Richmond FC, Melbourne 1996

External links
SA Football Hall of Fame - Michael A Nunan

Living people
Sturt Football Club players
Richmond Football Club players
Norwood Football Club players
North Adelaide Football Club players
Fitzroy Football Club coaches
North Adelaide Football Club coaches
South Australian State of Origin players
Australian rules footballers from South Australia
South Australian Football Hall of Fame inductees
1949 births